The 2007 WNBA All-Star Game was played on July 15, 2007 at Verizon Center in Washington D.C., home of the Washington Mystics. The game was the 8th annual WNBA All-Star Game. This was the second time Washington has hosted the basketball showcase, after previously hosting the 2002 game.

The All-Star Game

Rosters

1 Injured
2 Injury replacement
3 Starting in place of injured player

Coaches
The coach for the Western Conference all-stars was Sacramento Monarchs coach Jenny Boucek. The coach for the Eastern Conference was Detroit Shock coach Bill Laimbeer.

Other events

Three-Point Shootout

Skills Challenge

References

Wnba All-star Game, 2007
Women's National Basketball Association All-Star Game